The Beagle A.61 Terrier is a British single-engined monoplane built by Beagle Aircraft.

Development 

The Auster Aircraft Company purchased a large number of former British Army Auster aircraft during the late 1950s. These were Auster AOP.6, T.7 and T.10 aircraft which were updated and modified with de Havilland Gipsy Major 10-1-1 engines.  Initially two versions were offered for sale in the civilian market from 1960:

 Auster 6A Tugmaster – a utility and glider towing aircraft
 Auster 6B – a three-seat luxury version. When the company became part of Beagle Aircraft in 1960, the Auster 6B was renamed the Beagle A.61 Terrier 1.

In 1962 the Beagle A.61 Terrier 2 was introduced with a greater span tailplane, wheel spats and a metal propeller.

The Terrier was not an economic success for the manufacturer as it was found that more man-hours were spent on rebuilding each aircraft after its military use than were spent in building the new aircraft for the Army. It was also out-dated as, by 1961, most competing manufacturers were introducing new designs which were all-metal, with tricycle undercarriages and powered by more modern engines such as Lycoming or Continental (e.g. the Cessna 150 and the Piper Cherokee). However the Terrier has found many adherents among vintage light aircraft owner pilots. Examples of the type were purchased by owners in the United Kingdom, Eire, Germany, Netherlands, New Zealand and Sweden. 23 Terriers were registered in the UK in 2013.

Production
Terrier 1 
Eighteen Terrier 1 conversions were built. The first conversion flew 13 April 1961 from Rearsby.
Terrier 2
Forty-Five Terrier 2 conversions were completed at Rearsby. A small number of airframes were converted subsequently to this standard by other companies.
Terrier 3
One Terrier 3 powered by a 160 hp Lycoming O-320-B2B engine was essentially complete at Rearsby when Terrier production was stopped in 1966.  In 1967, an incomplete Terrier 2 was modified to this standard by British European Airways engineering apprentices and registered G-AVYK.

Specifications (Terrier 2)

See also

References

Bibliography
N.H. Ellison and R.O. MacDemitria, Auster Aircraft Production list, 1966, Air-Britain (Historians) Ltd, ISBN none

External links

Beagle Terrier – British Aircraft Directory

High-wing aircraft
1960s British civil utility aircraft
Terrier
Single-engined tractor aircraft
Glider tugs
Auster aircraft
Aircraft first flown in 1961